Nebraska Highway 116 is a highway in northeastern Nebraska. Its southern terminus is at an intersection with Nebraska Highway 15 west of Concord. N-116 turns northeast, and intersects Nebraska Spur 26B (S-26B). The route then travels north, through the town of Dixon, and ti its northern terminus at U.S. Highway 20 (US 20). The route was designated in 1953, and has not changed significantly since.

Route description
The whole route is in Dixon County. It is in mostly rural farmland. N-116 starts at the intersection of N-15 and travels northeastward. The road crosses over Logan Creek Dredge in a truss bridge. It meets the western terminus of S-26B as it turns north. The road enters Dixon, and crosses over a railroad owned by Nebraska Northeastern Railway. N-116 soon leaves Dixon, and ends at US 20.

History
A gravel road from west of Concord to US 20 has been in the state highway system since 1937. By 1948, the road was extended southwest to connect to N-15. The road became designated as N-116 by 1953, two years before the official state highway system was created. N-116 was resurfaced in bitumen in 1964.

Major intersections

References

External links

Nebraska Roads: NE 101-119
The Nebraska Highways Page: Highways 101 to 300

116
Transportation in Dixon County, Nebraska